Colors is an unreleased Gizmondo game that uses the console's GPS system to allow the player to play in the area where the player is located in real life, in the game. Colors was intended to be the world's first GPS video game, but due to Gizmondo's bankruptcy, it was never officially released. However, the game leaked and distributed online in 2008.

There was a mostly complete version of Colors that was circulated on the Internet. When first playing Colors, it appears the multiplayer game, called TurfWar, is offline. After a player gains 30,000 dollars, it unlocks. Another unlockable is the tag editor which allows players to spraypaint custom tags around the city. It is unlocked after beating a certain mission in the game.

The multiplayer mode of the game does not function.

On November 30, 2015, Carl Freer announced plans to re-release the game for iOS and Google Play.

Gameplay
Gameplay in Colors is very similar to many popular third person shooter games, like Grand Theft Auto, Resident Evil 4, or Max Payne. The player cannot manually target body parts like the head or arms, but instead, the reticle moves automatically, slowing down and becoming more precise depending on the player's movement. If the player strafes or moves more while targeting, the reticle wildly bobs around, making it difficult to aim and shoot accurately.

The player may select a character at the beginning of the game. The characters differ in appearance. Two stats, health and stamina, are also presented.

A button must be held to strafe, and due to the Gizmondo's lack of an analog stick, a button must also be pressed to activate running, though it must only be pressed once.

The game's weapon selection is split into different types. There are rifles, shotguns, pistols, and explosives, as well as some improvised weapons like nailguns. There are no melee weapons, however, only ranged ones.

In the game, the player can be caught by the police and taken to a prison cell with three people in it. Two of them offer to get the player out at a price, while the third will offer assistance in exchange for sex rather than money. After that, the player is transported to the hospital and allowed to leave.

Crimson City itself is mostly free roaming, but divided into several small areas with loading screens. The locales in the game include a train station (where the game begins and ends), a China Town, a Little Italy, a Little Mexico, a junk yard, some docks, and an area without a particular theme but with a man selling C4 explosives. Some of the highest paying missions are also in this area.

Overall, there are about forty missions in the game, and no main story, so all of them are self-contained stories of the character's services to multiple people. Each boss has their own small story that is uncovered more, such as one female Spanish boss who is being followed around by a junkyard worker, and finally gets kidnapped by the worker, leaving the character to save her and kill him.

Story
The game takes place in the fictional Crimson City. The game contains little to no story and does not explain the reason why the main character is in the city, nor why he begins to commit crimes. The character is simply introduced by a vague CG intro arriving by train. The people the player works for include a pimp in the stereotypical purple suit and hat, a corrupt police officer, a gamut of gangsters, and many criminals fitting stereotypes of their race.

During the game's missions, the player is given jobs such as hiding drugs for a cop, removing someone's life support plug, getting high on drugs and chasing a man in a rabbit suit through a maze-like building.

The game ends with the main character leaving the city as ambiguously as he came in. After beating the game, the player is able to select a lot more character models to play as, including many of the denizens within Crimson City itself, such as the pizza seller, the drug rabbit, the gun dealer, Mr. Smith, who has some of the best stats in the game, and a medieval knight, which is never seen regularly in the game.

References

External links
Colors at GameSpot
Colors at IGN
Colors at Lost Levels

Cancelled Gizmondo games
Organized crime video games
Third-person shooters
Location-based games